The Trenton Historic District in Trenton, Tennessee is a  historic district which was listed on the National Register of Historic Places in 1982.  The listing included 96 contributing buildings.

According to its National Register nomination, "The District is a cultural resource, not only for its attractive tree-lined streets which lead to the public square, but for its enduring ties with the past. Despite alterations and the intrusion of modern structures which do not meet the architectural standards of the preceding generations, the Trenton District retains its well-established residential character and represents the largest collection of historic architecture within Gibson County."

References

Historic districts on the National Register of Historic Places in Tennessee
National Register of Historic Places in Gibson County, Tennessee
Greek Revival architecture in Tennessee
Queen Anne architecture in Tennessee